La Bouche du Roi (French - the king's mouth) may refer to:

"La Bouche du Roi", the royal catering department within the Maison du roi  The "Bouche du roi" of ancien regime France
La Bouche du Roi (artwork)